George Taylor, M.A. (died 1811) was Rector of Aldford from 1769 until his death; and Archdeacon of Chester from 21 January 1786 to his resignation on 20 November 1786.

References

1811 deaths
19th-century English Anglican priests
18th-century English Anglican priests
Archdeacons of Chester
Alumni of Oriel College, Oxford